Frederick Osborne (1909–1996) was an Australian politician and government minister.

Frederick Osborn(e) may also refer to:
Fred Osborn (1883–1954), Canadian baseball player
Fred Osborne (1865–?), Major League Baseball pitcher and outfielder
Frederic Osborn (1885–1978), urban planner
Frederick Osborn (sportsman) (1889–1954), English cricketer and footballer
Frederick Osborn (1889–1981), American philanthropist, military leader, and eugenicist
Frederick Ernest Osborne (1878–1948), Canadian politician
Frederick Osborne (boxer)